Andrew "Andy" Hodgson is a professional rugby league and rugby union footballer who played in the 1990s, 2000s and 2010s.

References

External links
1999 RUGBY LEAGUE: TEAM-BY-TEAM GUIDE TO SUPER LEAGUE
Photograph at wharfedalerufc.co.uk

1976 births
Living people
Bradford Bulls players
English rugby league players
English rugby union players
Place of birth missing (living people)
Rugby league fullbacks
Rugby league wingers
Rugby union centres
Wakefield Trinity players
Wharfedale R.U.F.C. players